Reflections in Blue is an album by American composer, bandleader and keyboardist Sun Ra recorded in 1986 in Italy and released on the Black Saint label in 1987.

Reception
The Allmusic review by Scott Yanow awarded the album 4½ stars and stated that "this studio set is not recommended for swing purists who take life too seriously, but the creative and often crazy music should delight many listeners".

Track listing
All compositions by Sun Ra except as indicated
 "State Street Chicago" - 7:52  
 "Nothin' from Nothin (Pat Patrick) - 4:24  
 "Yesterdays" (Otto Harbach, Jerome Kern) - 7:46  
 "Say It Isn't So" (Irving Berlin) - 6:11  
 "I Dream Too Much" (Dorothy Fields, Jerome Kern) - 5:03  
 "Reflections in Blue" - 8:20  
Recorded at Jingle Machine Studio, Milano, on December 18 and 19, 1986.

Personnel
Sun Ra - piano, synthesizer, vocals
Randall Murray - trumpet
Tyrone Hill - trombone
Pat Patrick - alto saxophone, clarinet
Marshall Allen - alto saxophone, flute, piccolo, oboe
Danny Ray Thompson - alto saxophone, baritone saxophone, flute, bongos
John Gilmore - tenor saxophone, clarinet, timbales
Eloe Omoe - alto saxophone, alto clarinet, bass clarinet
James Jacson - bassoon, Ancient Egyptian Infinity Drum
Ronald Wilson - tenor saxophone
Carl LeBlanc - electric guitar
Tyler Mitchell - bass
Thomas Hunter, Earl "Buster" Smith - drums

References

Black Saint/Soul Note albums
Sun Ra albums
1987 albums